Bill Barber (born October 2, 1970) is a former professional tennis player from the United States.

Biography
Barber, the son of a tennis referee, grew up in Brandywine, Maryland. He played collegiate tennis at UCLA, then in the early 1990s competed professionally.

At the 1994 Legg Mason Tennis Classic he made it through qualifying and beat Alex O'Brien in the first round, before being eliminated in the second round by Jonathan Stark.

He won two Challenger titles in doubles, at Brasilia and Seoul in 1994.

Challenger titles

Doubles: (2)

References

External links
 
 

1970 births
Living people
American male tennis players
UCLA Bruins men's tennis players
Tennis people from Maryland
20th-century American people
21st-century American people